William (Billy)John Downer is a retired South African prosecutor, known for his prosecution of high profile government corruption cases.

Background
After Downer graduated from Stellenbosch University he was awarded a Rhodes Scholarship to study at the University of Oxford, United Kingdom, where he obtained a Bachelor of Civil Law degree. He thereafter, joined the South African Department of Justice, the forerunner to the National Prosecuting Authority. In 2021, he retired in Cape Town, South Africa.

Jacob Zuma prosecution  

Despite his retirement, as of 2022, Downer was still prosecuting the former President of South Africa, Jacob Zuma, on charges of fraud and corruption. The case against the former President relates to a government arms procurement deal, dating back to 1999. In 2005, Downer secured the conviction of Zuma’s financial advisor, Schabir Shaik.The prosecution of Zuma has taken many years with Zuma having been accused of using Stalingrad tactics to evade his day in court. He is now set to go on trial in August 2022.

Zuma objected to Downer’s involvement in his case and claimed that the retired prosecutor acted unlawfully by leaking information to the media. Downer has previously been accused of leaking information to journalists to benefit his public image and his cases. Zuma is currently privately prosecuting Downer.

References

External links
 Zuma: after 13 years Downer is vindicated, News24, 30 April 2016 
 Lessons from the fight against corruption, UCT Monday Paper, 19 October 2007 
 How we nailed Shaik, The Star, 9 June 2005.

Living people
South African Rhodes Scholars
Stellenbosch University alumni
20th-century South African lawyers
1956 births
21st-century South African lawyers